Tuan Anh Vu (born December 5, 1957), better known as Tommy or Tom Vu, is a Vietnamese American poker player, real estate investor and speaker best remembered as an infomercial personality in the late 1980s and early 1990s.

Infomercial career
His late-night infomercial featured Vu surrounded by luxury items: mansions, yachts, and expensive cars. He was often shown accompanied by groups of young bikini-clad women. He promoted his free 90-minute seminar to learn the same secrets he used to make millions. As a Vietnamese immigrant, he presented himself as the classic "rags to riches" story. His infomercials promoted free seminars that served as advertisements for paid seminars, the most expensive of which was a week-long seminar held only in Orlando, Florida that cost as much as $16,000. Vu's investment theory involved finding what he characterized as "distressed" properties, such as homes mired in foreclosures, bankruptcies, divorces or tax liens, and selling them at a profit.

In the early 1990s, Vu was sued by former students and investigated by government officials in Florida for alleged violations of securities laws, fraud and false advertising. He was never formally charged with any crime.

Formerly of Longwood, Florida and later a California resident, Vu has retired from real estate and lives in Las Vegas, Nevada.

Professional poker career
Vu continues his parallel career as a tournament poker player. As of 2017, he had won more than $1,975,000 in casino poker tournaments, including a second-place finish in a no limit Texas hold 'em event at the 2007 World Series of Poker and a 22nd-place finish at the 2005 World Series of Poker championship event. His 10 cashes at the WSOP account for over $850,000 of his lifetime tournament winnings.

In April 2006, he finished ninth in the Season Five World Poker Tour championship event, earning $216,585.

References in popular culture
Vu and his infomercials and seminars have been parodied numerous times, including on the animated series Courage the Cowardly Dog, King of the Hill, Beavis and Butt-head and Family Guy, TV sketch shows In Living Color and Saturday Night Live, the 1995 Troma film Blondes Have More Guns, Martin Scorsese's film The Wolf of Wall Street and in the 2013 Michael Bay film Pain & Gain. Vu was interviewed by Tom Arnold for his HBO comedy special Tom Arnold: The Naked Truth. Vu was also one of the subjects of Renee Tajima-Peña's documentary series about Asian Americans, MY AMERICA... (or Honk if You Love Buddha).

Vu was also referred to in episode 6 of Showtime's Superpumped: The Battle for Uber.

Notes

External links

Article describing Vu's infomercials
Video clip of classic Tom Vu infomercial at YouTube Video clip of classic Tom Vu infomercial at YouTube

1957 births
American infotainers
American investors
American poker players
American real estate businesspeople
Living people
People from Longwood, Florida
Vietnamese emigrants to the United States
Vietnamese poker players
Vietnamese investors
Television personalities from Florida